Nicky Pastorelli (born 11 April 1983) is a Dutch professional racing driver.

Motorsports career

Euro Formula 3000
Born in The Hague, Pastorelli participated in Euro Formula 3000 for Scuderia Fama in 2003. He finished on the podium twice and placed fifth in the season championship.

For 2004, Pastorelli signed with the defending champion Draco Junior Team. Pastorelli won the championship by one point over Fabrizio Del Monte with 2 wins among 6 podium finishes in the 10 series races.

Formula One testing
This result gained him a Formula One test at Minardi, and in 2005 Pastorelli was appointed official Jordan Grand Prix test driver, and was the first driver in the Young Driver Development Program of MF1 Racing. However, none of these tests resulted in a Formula One race drive for Pastorelli.

Champ Car
Pastorelli made his debut at Grand Prix of Houston in the second race of the season, in Rocketsports' only entry. He qualified 16th of the 17 cars, and retired after 29 laps with a mechanical failure. His first finish, in 15th, came  in the next race at Grand Prix of Monterrey, and in his first and only oval start at the Milwaukee Mile he finished 10th. His best Champ Car finish came in his final race in the series at the Grand Prix of Montreal. He was replaced for the final three races of the season by veteran Mario Domínguez.

American Le Mans Series

In 2008 and 2009, Pastorelli has competed in the GT2 class of the American Le Mans Series for VICI Racing in a Porsche 911 GT3. In 2008, he also finished 3rd in the GT class of the Dutch Supercar Challenge in a Volkswagen Passat.

Career summary
2000
Formula Arcobaleno Netherlands, Competed in 6 out of 8 races: 5 wins, 3 poles, 3rd place in Championship
2001
Italian Formula Renault 2000 - 18th place
2002
European Formula Renault 2000 - 9 race starts, no points
2003
Euro Formula 3000 Series: 2 second place finishes and 5th in the championship
2004
Superfund Euro 3000 - Championship winner,  2 victories
Champ Car Test with Walker Racing at Sebring International Raceway
2005
Formula 1 test with Minardi at Misano (January)
Official Jordan F1 test driver and in Young Driver Development Program of Midland F1
2006
Official 3rd driver — Midland F1
Champ Car — Partial season driving with Rocketsports Racing in Champ Car. - 17th place
2008
Dutch Supercar Challenge - Papagayo Racing, Volkswagen Passat V8 STAR - 3rd place
American Le Mans Series GT2 - VICI Racing, Porsche 911 GT3 RSR - 22nd place (GT2 drivers championship)
2009
American Le Mans Series GT2 - VICI Racing, Porsche 911 GT3 RSR

Motorsports career results

American Open Wheel racing
(key)

Complete Champ Car results

Complete GT1 World Championship results

* Season still in progress.

External links
 
 
 

Living people
1983 births
Sportspeople from The Hague
Dutch racing drivers
Champ Car drivers
Auto GP drivers
Italian Formula Renault 2.0 drivers
Formula Renault Eurocup drivers
FIA GT1 World Championship drivers
American Le Mans Series drivers
Dutch people of Italian descent
International GT Open drivers
24H Series drivers
Draco Racing drivers
Rocketsports Racing drivers
GT4 European Series drivers